USS Spica is a name used more than once by the United States Navy:

 , a Sirus-class cargo ship commissioned by the U.S. Navy for service in World War II.
 , a  laid down, 1 April 1965, at Swan Hunter & Wigham Richardson Ltd., Wallsend-On-Tyne, United Kingdom for the Royal Navy as RFA Tarbatness (A-345) and launched, 1 February 1967.

References 

United States Navy ship names